Quincy Jones—American record producer, musical arranger, film composer, impresario, conductor, and trumpeter—has charted 6 singles and 6 albums in the top 40 and won 4 Platinum Awards and 7 Gold Awards only in the United States. Jones is one of few producers to have number one records in three consecutive decades (1960s, 1970s, and 1980s).

Albums

As leader

Soundtracks

As sideman

As composer, conductor, arranger, producer

Singles

References

Jazz discographies
Production discographies
Pop music discographies
Discographies of American artists
Production Discography